The Damascus Titan missile explosion (also called the Damascus accident) was a 1980 U.S. nuclear weapons incident involving a Titan II Intercontinental Ballistic Missile (ICBM). The incident occurred on September 18–19, 1980, at Missile Complex 374-7 in rural Arkansas when a U.S. Air Force LGM-25C Titan II ICBM loaded with a 9-megaton W-53 nuclear warhead experienced a liquid fuel explosion inside its silo. 

The warhead landed a short distance away and no radioactive material was lost.

Launch complex 

The Strategic Air Command facility of Little Rock Air Force Base was one of eighteen silos in the command of the 308th Strategic Missile Wing (308th SMW), specifically one of the nine silos within its 374th Strategic Missile Squadron (374th SMS), at the time of the explosion.

Incident

Leadup 
At around  CDT on Thursday, September 18, 1980, two airmen from a Propellant Transfer System (PTS) team were checking the pressure on the oxidizer tank of a USAF Titan II missile at Little Rock AFB's Launch Complex 374-7. Powell later claimed that he was already below ground in his safety suit when he realized he had brought the wrong wrench, so he chose to continue rather than turn back. The  socket fell off the ratchet and dropped approximately  before bouncing off a thrust mount and piercing the missile's skin over the first-stage fuel tank, causing it to leak a cloud of its Aerozine 50 fuel.

Aerozine 50 is hypergolic with the Titan II's oxidizer, dinitrogen tetroxide, such that they spontaneously ignite upon contact with each other. The nitrogen tetroxide is kept in a second tank in the rocket's first stage, directly above the fuel tank and below the second stage and its nine-megaton W-53 nuclear warhead.

Eventually, the missile combat crew and the PTS team evacuated the launch control center, while military and civilian response teams arrived to tackle the hazardous situation. Lieutenant General Lloyd R. Leavitt Jr., the Vice Commander of the Strategic Air Command, commanded the effort to save the launch complex. There was concern for the possible collapse of the now empty first-stage fuel tank, which could cause the rest of the 8-story missile to fall and rupture, allowing the oxidizer to contact the fuel already in the silo.

Explosion 

Early in the morning of Friday, September 19, a two-man PTS investigation team consisting of Senior Airman David Lee Livingston and Sergeant Jeff K. Kennedy entered the silo. Because their vapor detectors indicated an explosive atmosphere, the two were ordered to evacuate. The team was then ordered to reenter the silo to turn on an exhaust fan. The initial explosion catapulted the 740-ton silo door away from the silo and ejected the second stage and warhead. Once clear of the silo, the second stage exploded. Its safety features prevented any loss of radioactive material or nuclear detonation.

Aftermath 
Livingston died at the hospital, and 21 others in the immediate vicinity of the blast sustained various injuries; Kennedy struggled with respiratory issues from inhaling oxidizer but survived. Livingston was posthumously promoted to staff sergeant. The entire missile launch complex was destroyed.

At daybreak, the Air Force retrieved the warhead, which was returned to the Pantex weapons assembly plant.

The launch complex was never repaired. Pieces of debris were taken away from the  surrounding the facility, and the site was buried under a mound of gravel, soil, and small concrete debris. The land is now under private ownership. The site was listed on the National Register of Historic Places on February 18, 2000.

Kennedy, initially praised as a hero, later received an official letter of reprimand for his first entry into the complex, as it later transpired that he had disregarded an order to stay away.

Popular culture
A 1988 television film, Disaster at Silo 7, is based on this event.

Season 4, episode 4 (ep. 75) of Scorpion is largely based on this event.

In September 2013, Eric Schlosser published a book titled Command and Control: Nuclear Weapons, the Damascus Accident, and the Illusion of Safety. It focused on the explosion, as well as other Broken Arrow incidents during the Cold War. A documentary film titled Command and Control from director Robert Kenner, based on Schlosser's book, was released on January 10, 2017. The film was broadcast by PBS as part of its American Experience series.

Jeff Plumb's account of his role in the incident was featured in a 2017 episode of WBEZ's This American Life.

See also
List of military nuclear accidents
National Register of Historic Places listings in Van Buren County, Arkansas
1965 Searcy missile silo fire

References

1980 disasters in the United States
1980 in military history
Military nuclear accidents and incidents
History of Arkansas
1980 in Arkansas
National Register of Historic Places in Van Buren County, Arkansas
September 1980 events in the United States
Nuclear accidents and incidents in the United States
Explosions in 1980
Van Buren County, Arkansas